Crematogaster affabilis is a species of ant in tribe Crematogastrini. It was described by Forel in 1907.

References

affabilis
Insects described in 1907